The 1935 Coupe de France Final was a football match held at Stade Olympique Yves-du-Manoir, Colombes on 5 May 1935, that saw Olympique de Marseille defeat Stade Rennais UC 3–0 thanks to goals by Charles Roviglione, Vilmos Kohut and an own goal by Jean Laurent.

Match details

See also
Coupe de France 1934-1935

External links
Coupe de France results at Rec.Sport.Soccer Statistics Foundation
Report on French federation site

Coupe
1935
Coupe De France Final 1935
Coupe De France Final 1935
Sport in Hauts-de-Seine
Coupe de France Final
Coupe de France Final